Chen Zhixin is the president of SAIC Motor, the largest car maker in China. Chen Zhixin has been president of SAIC Motor since June 2014.

References

Living people
Businesspeople from Shanghai
Year of birth missing (living people)
SAIC Motor people